The Ducati Streetfighter is a streetfighter motorcycle produced by Ducati.
The Streetfighter was designed by Damien Basset of the Ducati design team. Ducati sold the Streetfighter in three variations – the Streetfighter 1099 cc from 2009 to 2011, the Streetfighter S 1099 cc from 2009 to 2012, and the Streetfighter 848 849 cc from 2011 to 2015.

Awards
The Streetfighter 848 won the Cycle World Best Middleweight Streetbike title in 2013. Eric Piscione once held the Middleweight lap record at the Pikes Peak International Hill Climb.

References

External links

Streetfighter
Standard motorcycles
Motorcycles introduced in 2009